The 20th government of Turkey (9 March 1951 – 17 May 1954) was a government in the history of Turkey. It is also called the second Menderes government.

Background 
Democrat Party (DP) had won the elections held on 14 May 1950, but prime minister Adnan Menderes resigned on 8 March 1951 in order to renew his cabinet. There were three new names in the new cabinet.

The government
In the list below, the  cabinet members who served only a part of the cabinet's lifespan are shown in the column "Notes".

Aftermath
The government ended with the general elections held on 2 May 1954.

References

Cabinets of Turkey
Democrat Party (Turkey, 1946–1961) politicians
1951 establishments in Turkey
1954 disestablishments in Turkey
Cabinets established in 1951
Cabinets disestablished in 1954
Members of the 20th government of Turkey
9th parliament of Turkey
Democrat Party (Turkey, 1946–1961)